The Vicariate Apostolic of Mackenzie was formerly part of the Athabaska-Mackenzie Vicariate and became a separate entity in 1901. It encompassed the Yukon with the remainder of the territory being renamed the Vicariate Apostolic of Athabasca. It was elevated to the episcopal see of Mackenzie-Fort Smith in 1967.

Diocesan bishops
 Gabriel-Joseph-Elie Breynat, O.M.I. (1901-1943), "The Bishop of the Winds", Titular Bishop of Adramyttium (1901) and Titular Archbishop of Garella (1939)
 Joseph-Maria Trocellier, O.M.I. (1943-1958) 
 Paul Piché, O.M.I. (1959-1967)

References

External links 
 the  Catholic Encyclopedia
 Giga - Catholic info

Mackenzie
Catholic Church in Canada
Christian organizations established in 1901
1901 establishments in Canada